George E. Smith was an English professional football outside forward who played in the Football League for Brentford.

Career 
An outside forward, Smith began his career at hometown Second Division club South Shields. He was one of a number of northeasterners to make the move to Third Division club Brentford for the club's first season in the Football League in 1920–21. Smith was included in the squad for the Bees' first-ever league match on 28 August 1920, but fell behind George Taylor in the pecking order and made just 9 appearances all season before being released.

Career statistics

References

Year of birth missing
English footballers
English Football League players
Brentford F.C. players
Date of death missing
South Shields F.C. (1889) players
Footballers from South Shields
Association football outside forwards